= Veppanatham =

Veppanatham vpm
- village
- Location in Tamil Nadu, India Veppanatham (India)
- Coordinates: 11°38′55″N 78°46′10″E
- Country: India
- State: Tamil Nadu
- District: salem

Languages
  - Official: Tamil
- Time zone: UTC+5:30 (IST)
- PIN: 636112
- Nearest city: Attur, Kallakurichi

Veppanatham is a village located in Salem district, Tamil Nadu, India. Ponnolinagar village is also under Veppanatham Panchayath.

== Location ==
It is located 77 km towards east from district headquarters Salem 10 km from Thalaivasal and 25 km from Attur and also 16 km from Chinnasalem.
